Errol Vieth (born 1950) is a senior lecturer at the School of Contemporary Communication, at Central Queensland University, Australia, a researcher, and an author.

Vieth's has Ph.D in Philosophy from the School of Film, Media and Cultural Studies at Griffith University, as well as a Master of Education from Deakin University.

His resume discusses expertise in history of science in film, public perception of science/scientists in media, motorcycling culture and Australian film.

Bibliography
 
 
 Angels in the Media: Constructing outlaw motorcyclists. In Cryle, Denis  and Hillier, Jean (Eds.)Consent and Consensus: Politics, Media and Governance in Twentieth Century Australia (2005), 
 Screening Science: Contexts, Texts, and Science in Fifties Science Fiction Film : Contexts, Texts, and Science in Fifties Science Fiction Film (2001), Scarecrow Press, 
Oliver, D., Luck, J. and Vieth, E. Chalk to Cable: Conquering the Tyranny of Distance in Australian Higher Education (1998) Proceedings of the Networked Lifelong Learning International Conference, April, University of Sheffield, Sheffield, pp 4.59–4.66.
Writing and planning: the use of e-mail for distance education. (1995) In Creating Materials for Flexible Learning. Central Queensland University: Distance Education Centre.

References 

1950 births
Living people
Australian non-fiction writers
Academic staff of Central Queensland University